Valērijs Agešins (born June 23, 1972 in Liepāja) is a Latvian politician and lawyer. He is a member of Harmony and a deputy of the Saeima, elected to represent the Kurzeme electoral district. He began his current term in parliament on November 4, 2014.

From 1994-1998 he studied at the Immanuel Kant Baltic Federal University in Kaliningrad, graduating in history. He obtained a master's degree in pedagogy, and in 2002, he graduated from the Baltic Russian Institute as a lawyer. He is not however, a qualified attorney.

From 1997-1998 he worked in a teacher training summer camp and from 1995-1999 as a law and political science lecturer at the Institute of Social Technologies. From 1998-2002 he was a history teacher at Liepāja High School where he was a member of the secondary school teachers' union committee. In 2002 he became a member of the Liepāja City Public Reconciliation Commission, becoming Vice-President. Later in 2002 he was elected to the Saeima, and was re-elected again in 2006. His area of specialization is legal issues, the Parliamentary Justice Committee and the Committee on European Affairs.

He speaks three languages, Russian, Latvian, English and enjoys football, swimming, volleyball and basketball.

References

External links
Page at the Harmony Centre website
Saeima website

1972 births
Living people
Politicians from Liepāja
Latvian people of Russian descent
National Harmony Party politicians
Social Democratic Party "Harmony" politicians
Deputies of the 8th Saeima
Deputies of the 9th Saeima
Deputies of the 10th Saeima
Deputies of the 11th Saeima
Deputies of the 12th Saeima
Deputies of the 13th Saeima
Latvian legal scholars
Immanuel Kant Baltic Federal University alumni
University of Latvia alumni